Burun may refer to:
 Burun people, of Sudan
 Burun language, spoken by the Burun people
 Burun, Iran, a village in Zanjan Province, Iran